MVP: The Secret Lives of Hockey Wives (known as Trophy Wives in the United Kingdom) is a 2008 Canadian television series that debuted January 11, 2008 on CBC Television.

The program was cancelled by the CBC on March 7, 2008.  Poor ratings and high production costs were cited as reasons for the cancellation.

Summary 
The show portrays the lives of hockey players and their wives when they are off the ice. The show is set in Canada, where hockey is a favourite sport.

The show centres on the Mustangs, a professional hockey team. After the death of veteran captain Adam McBride, there are many changes in store for the team and others connected: Gabe McCall, the coach's son, becomes the team captain; a rookie named Trevor Lemonde is controversially added to the team; McBride's wife, Evelyn, and their daughter Molly, must adjust to a new lifestyle after there is no money left to them.

According to producer Mary Young Leckie, the show is inspired by, although not a direct adaptation of, the British series Footballers' Wives.

Cast 
 Lucas Bryant as Gabe McCall
 Dillon Casey as Trevor Lemonde
 Matthew Bennett as Malcolm LeBlanc
 Peter Miller as Damon Trebuche
 Kristin Booth as Connie
 Anastasia Phillips as Tabbi
 Deborah Odell as Evelyn McBride
 Natalie Krill as Molly
 Olivia Waldriff as Grace Morris
 Amanda Brugel as Megan Chandler
 Alec McClure as Owen Chandler
 Deanna Dezmari as Katrina

Production 
The Screen Door production began filming in 2006 in the Toronto, London and Hamilton, Ontario areas and generated wide interest including from the National Hockey League itself. The budget for the first ten episodes was approximately $14 million. It was distributed by Screendoor International.

Episodes

United States 
MVP premiered Thursday, June 19, 2008 on SOAPnet, and had a special promotional airing Friday, June 20, 2008 on ABC after the Daytime Emmy Awards, where it was the lowest-rated Big Four network program of the week. The promotional subtitle in the United States was changed to He Shoots, She Scores.

United Kingdom 
Digital broadcaster Living TV has secured the rights to MVP in the UK, but only showed four episodes since airing it on May 4, 2009. The series has been re-titled Trophy Wives for the British market. After re-branding itself from Living Loves to Sky Living Loves starting January 2011, episodes have been re-shown (including those not previously broadcast on Living TV) every Thursday and Saturday.

References

External links 
 Behind the MVP door
 Sexy 'MVP' worries NHL
 Inside the CBC - MVP
 Hot enough to melt the ice: CBC's MVP
 

2008 Canadian television series debuts
2008 Canadian television series endings
2000s Canadian drama television series
CBC Television original programming
Canadian television soap operas
Ice hockey television series
Television shows filmed in London, Ontario
Television shows filmed in Toronto
Television shows filmed in Hamilton, Ontario